
Franz Reuß (17 April 1904 – 5 June 1992) was a general in the Luftwaffe of Nazi Germany during World War II. He was awarded the Knight's Cross of the Iron Cross in July 1944.

Awards

 German Cross in Gold on 21 August 1942 as Oberstleutnant i.G. (in the general staff) in the Stab/IV. Flieger-Korps
 Knight's Cross of the Iron Cross on 18 July 1944 as Generalmajor and commander of the 4.Flieger-Division

References

Citations

Bibliography

 
 

1904 births
1992 deaths
Military personnel from Augsburg
Luftwaffe World War II generals
Recipients of the Gold German Cross
Recipients of the Knight's Cross of the Iron Cross
People from the Kingdom of Bavaria
Major generals of the Luftwaffe